Dariush Borbor (born April 28, 1934), is an Iranian-French architect, urban planner, designer, sculptor, painter, researcher, and writer. In 1963, Borbor established his own firm under the name of Borbor Consulting Architects, Engineers, City Planners. In 1976, he set up Sphere Iran, a consortium of four specialist consulting firms, and proposed a comprehensive National Environmental Master plan for Iran. In 1992, he created the Research Institute and Library of Iranian Studies (RILIS) where he is the director.

Borbor is widely regarded as one of the avant-garde architects of the modern movement in Iran; a pioneer of modern urban planning, named by some as "father of modern urban planning", and a key figure in the promotion and creation of the High Urban Planning Council (1966). He was described by Swiss architectural critic Anthony Krafft as "one of the most innovative architects who is perhaps on the way of creating a Persian architectural style of the 20th century"; and French architectural critic Michel Ragon defined him as "the architect in search of a modern Iranian architectural style". He has won many competitions and received several international prizes and awards, including the Gold Mercury International from Italy, 50 Outstanding Architects of the World from the Second Belgrade Triennial of World Architecture, and the Pahlavi Royal Award.

Early life

Dariush Borbor was born in April 1934. His father was Gholam Hossein khan Borbor, one of the directors of the Iranian branch of the former Anglo-Iranian Oil Company (AIOC), congressman, ambassador-at-large, and one of the founding members of the Grand Lodge of Iran. Borbor had his primary schooling in Iran. At the age of thirteen, he moved to the United Kingdom for his secondary education, after which he obtained his General Certificate of Education from University of Cambridge (1952), a Bachelor of Architecture (1958) and a Master of Civic Design (1959) both from the University of Liverpool. He then went to specialize in the architecture of hot dry regions at the University of Geneva (1961) under the direction of the French architect and urban planner Eugène Beaudouin.

Career

While working for his PhD, he collaborated concurrently with the Swiss urban planner Professor Arnold Hoechel and the architects Robert Frei and Christian Hunziker on several projects, including the first automatic bowling alleys in Meyrin Commune, Geneva, and Beirut, Lebanon.

In 1961, he returned to Tehran as Deputy Technical Director of Iran-Rah, the largest Construction Co. of its time in Iran. In 1963, he created his own firm under the name of Borbor Consulting Architects, Engineers, City Planners. As President and managing director, he developed and expanded the business to a large multidisciplinary organization with several in-house departments which included: architecture, urban planning, environment, structure, mechanics, electricity and interior design. The firm employed a large number of highly qualified multi-national staff and included branch offices in several major cities in Iran.

A few months prior to the 1978 Iranian Islamic Revolution, Borbor moved to Paris, France where he founded the Borbor International Management Consultants (BIMC) to Architects, Engineers, Planners. BIMC offered consultancy services in design, management and documentation to architectural and planning firms. In 1984, he moved to Los Angeles where he was involved in some architectural consultancy and research on Iranian and Persianate subjects.

Borbor returned to Iran in 1991 and established the Research Institute and Library of Iranian Studies (RILIS), a non-profit, non-political, private and independent institution dedicated to the promotion of research in the field of Iranian and Persianate studies with special emphasis on novel and creative research. He is a Consultant and active contributor to the Encyclopædia Iranica.

Prizes and awards
 1958, Working Drawing Award, Architects' Journal, London, UK
 1959, First Prize, ideas competition for a Liverpool neighbourhood, Department of Civic Design, University of Liverpool, UK
 1965, First Prize, design of Persian Pavilion, Los Angeles
 1975, Gold Mercury International Award for project management, Rome, Italy
 1976, NIOC Award, seaside resort, Mahmoudabad, Caspian coast, Iran
 1976, First Prize, 2200-unit shopping mall (Bazaar Reza) in Mashhad, Iran
 1976, First Prize, monument, Mashhad, Iran.
 1977, First Prize, Temple of the Grand Lodge of Iran, Tehran, Iran.
 1978, Pahlavi Royal Award, for design, construction and management, 2200-unit shopping mall (Bazaar Reza) in record eleven months
 1988, 50 Outstanding Architects of the World, the Second Belgrade Triennial of World Architecture
 2020, Knight of the Order of Arts and Letters (Chevalier de l'Ordre des Arts et des Lettres)
 2021, Dariush Borbor in the EduRank 100 Notable alumni of University of Liverpool.
 2022, Dariush Borbor ranked as one of the most influential academic alumni of the University of Liverpool.
 2023, University of Liverpool 2023 Alumni Award.

Selected projects and writings

Architecture 
 1967, The Ice Palace recreation centre, Pahlavi Avenue, Tehran
 1971, Monument Mashhad (demolished in 2010)
 1976, Museum and library, Mashhad, Iran

Regional planning 
 1963–1966, Nowshahr-Chalus Regional Plan
 1964–1965, Caspian Coast Regional Plan
 1969–1973, Abadan-Khoramshahr Regional Plan

Urban and landscape design
 1968, Project for the urban renewal of Mashhad City Centre
 1968, Kakhk post-earthquake reconstruction
 1976, Bazaar Reza shopping mall, Mashhad

Bibliography
 Dariush Borbor, Majlis: Teheran, Iran, University of Liverpool, Google Books, Liverpool, 1958.
 "The Influence of Persian Gardens on Islamic Decoration", Architecture Formes Fonctions, vol. 14, ed. Anthony Krafft, Lausanne, Switzerland, 1968, pp. 84–91.
 D.Bourbour [Borbor], Projet de Rénovation de Haram Hazrat-e-Reza à Meched, A.A. Honar va Me'mari, Tehran, 1972.
 "Iran", The Encyclopedia of Urban Planning, McGraw-Hill, New York, 1974, pp. 553–567.
 "The Influence of Wine Culture in Iranian Architecture and the Region", Wine Culture in Iran and Beyond, Österreichischen Akademie der Wissenchaften (ÖAW) / Austrian Academy of Sciences, Vienna, 2014, pp. 259–275.
 Dariush Borbor, Dariush Borbor Compendium of Articles, Presentations and Interviews 1954-2018, Sahab Geographic & Drafting Institute, Tehran, 2018.

Gallery

See also
 Culture of Iran
 Islamic art
 Iranian art
 Islamic calligraphy
 List of Iranian artists

References

External links
 
 Iran Contemporary Architect’s Site
 Persian Studies Seminars, University of Cambridge
 Iran Heritage Foundation (IHF), From Persepolis to Isfahan: Dariush Borbor
 The Architect of Free Lines, interview with Dariush Borbor (داریوش بوربور، معمار خطوط آزاد)
 BBC Hard Talk Special, interview with Dariush Borbor (به عبارت دیگر ویژه: گفتگو با داریوش بوربور)
 Iran Heritage Foundation (IHF), «A Comparative Analysis of Contemporary Architecture in Iran and the West»  by Dr Dariush Borbor (Research Institute and Library of Iranian Studies), London, November 12, 2016, published on May 5, 2017
 Iran Heritage Foundation (IHF), «Different and Modern, yet Iranian» by Dr Dariush Borbor (BORBOR Consulting Architects, Engineers, Planners), London, November 12, 2016, published on May 5, 2017
 Iran Heritage Foundation (IHF), «Iranian Architects & Architecture: Panel discussion», London, November 12, 2016, published on May 5, 2017
 

Iranian architects
Iranian designers
Iranian sculptors
French urban planners
1934 births
20th-century French architects
University of Geneva alumni
Alumni of the University of Liverpool
Writers from Tehran
Naturalized citizens of France
Iranian emigrants to France
Living people
20th-century Iranian people
21st-century Iranian people
21st-century French architects